Proprotein convertase subtilisin/kexin type 4 is an enzyme that in humans is encoded by the PCSK4 gene.

References

Further reading